The BMW HP4 Race is a  four-cylinder engine sport bike made by BMW Motorrad in 2017 in a limited-production run of 750 units. It is a non-street-legal, track-only version of the HP4 variant of the BMW S1000RR.

Background 
Like the Honda RC213V-S and Ducati Superleggera, the HP4 Race does not qualify for any race series, and was made to display the manufacturer's technological prowess rather than for Homologation. BMW claims the HP4 Race produces  at 14,500 rpm, due to the higher rev limit over the normal HP4, which BMW says makes  at 13,900 rpm.

Most of the HP4 Race's design elements and engine are from the S1000RR, with many components re-tuned for higher performance, and adding greater adjustability, including a rake of 24.5° that can be decreased by 0.5° or increased by 1.0°. It has an all-carbon fiber chassis that BMW says weights , and fairing makes extensive use of carbon fiber. It has a GP style 1-up, 2-3-4-5-6-down shifting pattern. Like the S1000RR, HP4 Races have traction control and wheelie control, and a quickshifter. Because it is for track use only, it does not have lights or mirrors.

References 

HP4 Race
Sport bikes
Motorcycles introduced in 2017